Motor-paced racing and motor-paced cycling refer to cycling behind a pacer in a car or more usually on a motorcycle. The cyclist (or stayer in this case) follows as close as they can to benefit from the slipstream of their pacer. The first paced races were behind other cyclists, sometimes as many as five riders on the same tandem. Bordeaux-Paris and record attempts have been ridden behind cars. More usually races or training are behind motorcycles.

Origins of pacing 
Cyclists started to use tandem bicycles as pacers in the late 19th century. There could be as many as five riders on the pacing machine. Because of the long distances covered when following a pacer, these cyclists were called stayers, a term used in long-distance horse racing. Companies such as Dunlop sponsored pacing teams, and "tens of thousands" turned out to watch. The pacing tandems were ridden by professionals, of whom as many as 100 were under contract.

Speeds rose when engines were added to pacing tandems. Arthur Chase and the Frenchman Émile Bouhours set English records behind powered tandems in 1898 and 1899. Some races mixed pacing with solo bicycles, tandem and motorcycle, with the riders given different start points in compensation.

Pacing by car 
So was Paris–Roubaix. The historian Pierre Chany said: "Cars made only a brief appearance in Paris–Roubaix. On the roads of the north, these noisy cars, high with wooden wheels with their tires nailed in place, raised huge clouds of dust. The drivers, wearing leathers, their eyes protected by huge goggles, were stepping into the unknown! The noise was infernal and the column advanced in the stink of exhaust pipes."

Pacing by motorcycle 

The first races were limited more by the speed a motorcycle could achieve than the ability of the rider to follow, with  being a good average, according to the historian H. M. Ellis. The races became faster as the pacers became faster. Paced races kept audiences enthralled for many decades in Europe and, at one time, in North America. Tens of thousands watched, especially in Germany. The popularity of this form of pacing declined in the latter part of the 20th century.

There were few rules. Pacing machines had small rollers set sideways behind the back wheel to avoid crashes caused by the rider touching the back of the motorcycle, but there were few other regulations. Race distances extended to six days, although one-hour and  contests were more common. Windshields were briefly allowed but abandoned after the world championship in 1904.

Speeds rose and accidents became commonplace. An American, Harry Elkes, died of his injuries from a crash in front of 10 000 spectators at Boston, Massachusetts, USA. George Leander of Chicago said, "Only the clumsy get themselves killed" before starting a race at the Parc des Princes in Paris. Leander was thrown  into the air after , fell to the track, bounced into the seating and died 36 hours later. A crash in Berlin on 18 July 1909 killed nine when a motorcycle careered into the stands and exploded.

The historian Peter Nye wrote:

Motorpace racing was glamorous but dangerous. Falls were common, largely because bicycle tires tended to burst at speed. The riders wore neither helmets nor gloves. They depended on fast reflexes, the rude health of youth, and luck. Despite having all three, Bobby Walthour collected an impressive (or dismaying) inventory of injuries over his career: 28 fractures of the right collarbone, 18 of the left, 32 broken ribs, and 60 stitches to his face and head. Once, according to family history, he was given up for dead in Paris and taken to a morgue, where he regained consciousness on the slab.

The largest had two riders, one crouched over the handlebars to steer and the other sitting upright above the back wheel to protect the rider and to operate the engine. The pacers wore leathers, goggles and helmets but many riders wore a flat cap.

The world governing body, the Union Cycliste Internationale, set regulations for pacing motorcycles in 1920. Until then standards had been set by the police, particularly in Germany, or by the track promoters.

World championships were held annually, except during wars, for 100 years, often separately for amateurs and professionals. Carsten Podlesch, who won in 1994, is the last and reigning world champion. National championships continue in several European countries and European championships are conducted annually.

Motorcycles now used include the  Triumph Tiger or BMW machines. The motorcycle for motor-pacing has a roller on a frame at the rear to create a uniform distance to the cyclist. Some riders objected when the UCI insisted on them in 1920. The pacer stands or sits upright to offer a maximum windbreak, and the handlebars are extended to facilitate the stance, in a standardized leather suit that allows for the same slipstream effect for any rider.

The bicycles are steel, sturdy and have a smaller front wheel to let the stayer bend forward into the slipstream.

Pacing by Derny 

A Derny is a light motorbike typically driven by a  Zurcher two-stroke engine and by being pedaled through a fixed gear, typically of 70 teeth on the front chainring and 11 on the sprocket on the back wheel. The combination allows for smooth acceleration and slowing, important when the rider taking pace is centimetres from the pacer's shielded back wheel. A coupling between the motor and the back wheel ensures the machine will not stop dead if the motor seizes.

The first Entraineur or Bordeaux–Paris models, with a petrol  tank across the handlebars, were built by Roger Derny et Fils of the avenue de St Mandé, Paris, France in 1938.  That closed in 1957, though another company, Derny Service of rue de Picpus serviced and rebuilt machines into the 1970s. Derny also built a street adaptation called the Solo as well as tandems and mopeds.

The name derny is now applied to all such vehicles, regardless of manufacturer. It is used by the Larousse dictionary as a generic term for a small pacing motorcycle used in cycle races. The machine has to be bump-started. Riders behind Derny-pacers ride conventional track bicycles.

Bordeaux–Paris was paced by Dernys for part of its route from 1946 to 1985.

Pacers 
Cooperation between pacer and stayer includes the use of terms and signals understood internationally, because pacers and stayers may be of different nationalities. The stayer needs to be close to the roller to gain maximum profit from the slipstream; if he gets too close he may hit the roller and fall, if he falls too far behind it, he loses the slipstream effect and will quickly fall further back. The pacer then has to slow down so he can  catch up and then accelerate without again losing his rider.

Races 

Races are in velodromes or on other oval and steeply banked tracks to allow high-speed racing. After a flying start the cyclists link up with their pacers. Riding counterclockwise, passing can only be done on the right, a blue line separating the longer passing lane from the inner.

Keirin 
The keirin, a Japanese sprint with a paced start which has spread across the world, is a variation of motor-paced racing. A group of cyclists use a single pacer to get to speed and then sprint to the finish on their own.

Records 

From 1893 to 1895, Hélène Dutrieu set several women's paced hour records, ending with 39.190 km at Vélodrome Roubaisien. In 1896, Amélie Le Gall set a new women's paced hour record of 43.461 at Vélodrome Buffalo.

He rode behind a motor-powered tandem. The speed increased but records become more hazy because some were made under restrictions imposed by the Union Cycliste Internationale and others with no rules at all.

Frenchman José Meiffret, set a record  behind a Mercedes-Benz 300 SL on an Autobahn at Freiburg, Germany, on 16 July 1962. His bicycle had a 130-tooth chainring and wooden rims. Fred Rompelberg, using a dragster with a large shield as pacer, achieved  on the Bonneville Salt Flats on 15 October 1995.

He broke the previous record of  set by Guy Martin in 2013 behind a modified racing truck.

Mueller was coached by former record holder John Howard. It is not clear which authority was supervising the record attempt. On 17 September 2018, again at Bonneville, she took the world record with a top speed of 183.93 mph (296 km/h) behind a converted rail dragster with a fairing.

See also 
UCI Motor-paced World Championships
British National Derny Championships
French National Stayers Championships

References

External links 

Stayer.de - Information site (in German)
Film of failed attempt by Meiffret to set speed record in 1952 
Clifford L. Graves: A Date with Death (1965). About Meiffret's 1962 record attempt

Events in track cycling